This list is complete and up-to-date as of 2022 season.
The following is a list of players, both past and current, who appeared at least in one game for the Colorado Rockies franchise.

Players in Bold are members of the National Baseball Hall of Fame.

Players in Italics have had their numbers retired by the team.


A

Kurt Abbott
José Acevedo
Juan Acevedo
Cristhian Adames
Matt Adams
Jeremy Affeldt
Benny Agbayani
Scott Aldred
Eliézer Alfonzo
Luke Allen
Yency Almonte
Sandy Alomar Jr.
Yonder Alonso
Garvin Alston
Alexi Amarista
Alfredo Amézaga
Brett Anderson
Matt Anderson
Tyler Anderson
Eric Anthony
Danny Ardoin
Nolan Arenado
Alberto Árias
Rolando Arrojo
Miguel Asencio
Andy Ashby
Pedro Astacio
Garrett Atkins
Manny Aybar
John Axford

B

Roger Bailey
Jeff Baker
Daniel Bard
Sean Barker
Clint Barmes
Brandon Barnes
Jeff Barry
Kimera Bartee
Jason Bates
Denny Bautista
Robbie Beckett
Joe Beimel
Stan Belinda
Matt Belisle
Todd Belitz
Mark Bellhorn
Ronnie Belliard
Edwin Bellorín
Rigo Beltrán
Freddie Benavides
Gary Bennett
Christian Bergman
Wynton Bernard
Adam Bernero
Doug Bernier
Rafael Betancourt
Chad Bettis
Dante Bichette
Larry Bigbie
Bruce Billings
Jake Bird
Ty Blach
Charlie Blackmon
Willie Blair
Henry Blanco
Mitchell Boggs
Brian Bohanon
Daryl Boston
Kent Bottenfield
Sean Bouchard
Ben Bowden
Cedrick Bowers
Micah Bowie
Darren Bragg
Reid Brignac
Jorge Brito
Rex Brothers
Andrew Brown
Brooks Brown
Mark Brownson
Cliff Brumbaugh
Kris Bryant
Taylor Buchholz
John Burke
Ellis Burks
Jeromy Burnitz
Drew Butera
Brent Butler
Eddie Butler
Eric Byrnes

C

Edwar Cabrera
John Cangelosi
José Capellán
Matt Carasiti
Stephen Cardullo
Shane Carle
Bubba Carpenter
Giovanni Carrara
Jamey Carroll
Marcos Carvajal
Ryan Castellani
Pedro Castellano
Vinny Castilla
Frank Castillo
Daniel Castro
Miguel Castro
Simón Castro
Jhoulys Chacín
Shawn Chacón
Tyler Chatwood
Bobby Chouinard
Tim Christman
Jeff Cirillo
Jerald Clark
Darren Clarke
Royce Clayton
Edgard Clemente
J. D. Closser
Alan Cockrell
Greg Colbrunn
Alex Cole
Darnell Coles
Alvin Colina
Alex Colomé
Tyler Colvin
José Contreras
Aaron Cook
Mark Corey
Manuel Corpas
David Cortés
Craig Counsell
C. J. Cron
Rich Croushore
Jacob Cruz
Nelson Cruz
Michael Cuddyer
Noel Cuevas
Charlie Culberson
Jack Cust
Jim Czajkowski

D

David Dahl
Matt Daley
Vic Darensbourg
Joe Davenport
Kane Davis
Wade Davis
Zach Day
Yonathan Daza
Jorge De La Rosa
Valerio De Los Santos
Steve Decker
Samuel Deduno
Mike DeJean
Manny Delcarmen
Daniel Descalso
Ian Desmond
Elmer Dessens
Elías Díaz
Jairo Díaz
Corey Dickerson
Phillip Diehl
Craig Dingman
Jerry Dipoto
Scott Dohmann
Octavio Dotel
Tommy Doyle
Travis Driskill
Mike Dunn

E

Adam Eaton
Angel Echevarria
Mike Ekstrom
Scott Elarton
Brad Eldred
Mark Ellis
Alan Embree
Mario Encarnación
Edgmer Escalona
Mike Esposito
Bobby Estalella
Shawn Estes
Carlos Estévez
Horacio Estrada

F

Mike Farmer
Sal Fasano
Jeff Fassero
Ryan Feltner
Julián Fernández
Nate Field
Tommy Field
Steve Finley
Yohan Flande
Randy Flores
Josh Fogg
Dexter Fowler
Jeff Francis
Scott Fredrickson
Kyle Freeland
Choo Freeman
Marvin Freeman
Christian Friedrich
Jeff Frye
Brian Fuentes
Josh Fuentes

G

Jay Gainer
Andrés Galarraga
Ron Gant
Eddy Garabito
Rico Garcia
Jon Garland
Dustin Garneau
Cole Garner
Gonzalez Germen
Jason Giambi
Derrick Gibson
Gerónimo Gil
Lucas Gilbreath
Joe Girardi
Chris Gissell
Mychal Givens
Ross Gload
Austin Gomber
Héctor Gómez
Rene Gonzales
Carlos González
Chi Chi Gonzalez
Édgar González
Lariel González
Luis A. González
Curtis Goodwin
Tom Goodwin
Ashton Goudeau
Joe Grahe
Mark Grant
Jon Gray
Todd Greene
Randal Grichuk
Jason Grilli
Jason Gurka
Jeremy Guthrie

H

John Habyan
Luther Hackman
David Hale
Darryl Hamilton
Jason Hammel
Jeffrey Hammonds
Garrett Hampson
Justin Hampson
Mike Hampton
Ryan Hanigan
Tim Harikkala
Mike Harkey
Greg Harris
Lenny Harris
Will Harris
Joe Harvey
Ryan Hawblitzel
LaTroy Hawkins
Brad Hawpe
Charlie Hayes
Todd Helton
Butch Henry
Matt Herges
José Hernández
Liván Hernández
Pedro Hernández
Ramón Hernández
Jonathan Herrera
Bryan Hickerson
Sam Hilliard
Jason Hirsh
Denny Hocking
Jeff Hoffman
Greg Holland
Todd Hollandsworth
Matt Holliday
Gavin Hollowell
Darren Holmes
Craig House
Sam Howard
Trenidad Hubbard
Nick Hundley
Brian Hunter
Bruce Hurst
Butch Huskey
Mark Hutton

I
Chris Iannetta
José Iglesias

J

Mike James
Kevin Jarvis
Jason Jennings
Robin Jennings
José Jiménez
Ubaldo Jiménez
Connor Joe
Alan Johnson
Charles Johnson
D. J. Johnson
Howard Johnson
Bobby Jones
Chris Jones
Terry Jones
Todd Jones
Jorge Julio
Jair Jurrjens

K

Tommy Kahnle
Gabe Kapler
Scott Karl
Mike Kelly
Matt Kemp
Kyle Kendrick
Joe Kennedy
Logan Kensing
Bob Keppel
Brooks Kieschnick
Darryl Kile
Byung-hyun Kim
Sun-Woo Kim
Ray King
Mike Kingery
Tyler Kinley
Mark Knudson
Joe Koshansky
Kevin Kouzmanoff
Marc Kroon
Chad Kuhl

L

Aaron Laffey
Peter Lambert
Dinelson Lamet
Mike Lansing
Justin Lawrence
Aaron Ledesma
David Lee
DJ LeMahieu
Curt Leskanic
Matt Lindstrom
Nelson Liriano
Mark Little
Boone Logan
Aquilino López
Javier López
José López
Rodrigo López
Wilton López
Sean Lowe
Jonathan Lucroy
Jordan Lyles

M

John Mabry
Anderson Machado
Jeff Manship
Jeff Manto
Kirt Manwaring
Germán Márquez
Jason Marquis
Eli Marrero
Chris Martin
Tom Martin
Nick Masset
Kazuo Matsui
Tyler Matzek
Brent Mayne
Matt McBride
Zach McClellan
Mike McCoy
Quinton McCracken
Jeff McCurry
Chuck McElroy
Jake McGee
Collin McHugh
Walt McKeel
Michael McKenry
Ryan McMahon
Brian McRae
Roberto Mejía
Adam Melhuse
Tim Melville
Carlos Mendoza
Kent Mercker
José Mesa
Dan Miceli
Aaron Miles
Jim Miller
Justin Miller
Matt Miller
Kevin Millwood
Nate Minchey
Dustan Mohr
Elehuris Montero
Marcus Moore
Melvin Mora
David Moraga
Franklin Morales
José Morales
Juan Morillo
Justin Morneau
Clayton Mortensen
Guillermo Moscoso
Jason Motte
Taylor Motter
Jamie Moyer
José Mujica
Mike Munoz
Dale Murphy
Daniel Murphy
Tom Murphy
Matt Murton
Harrison Musgrave
Mike Myers

N

Denny Neagle
Blaine Neal
Chris Nelson
Pat Neshek
Josh Newman
Juan Nicasio
Chris Nichting
David Nied
Wil Nieves
Jayson Nix
Matt Nokes
Greg Norton
Dom Núñez
Vladimir Núñez

O

Scott Oberg
Alex Ochoa
Seung-hwan Oh
Miguel Ojeda
Omar Olivares
Darren Oliver
Miguel Olivo
Tim Olson
Rafael Ortega
José Ortiz
Ramón Ortiz
Roy Oswalt
Adam Ottavino
Josh Outman
Jayhawk Owens
Chris Owings
Pablo Ozuna

P

Jordan Pacheco
Matt Pagnozzi
Lance Painter
Kyle Parker
Gerardo Parra
Jeff Parrett
Wes Parsons
Jordan Patterson
Felipe Paulino
Ben Paulsen
Jay Payton
James Pazos
Kit Pellow
Elvis Peña
Joel Peralta
Neifi Pérez
Chris Petersen
Ben Petrick
J. R. Phillips
Paul Phillips
Jorge Piedra
Juan Pierre
Kevin Pillar
Scott Podsednik
Drew Pomeranz
Mike Porzio
Brooks Pounders
Jay Powell
Jason Pridie
Harvey Pulliam
Zach Putnam

Q
Chad Qualls
Omar Quintanilla

R

Brian Raabe
Ryan Raburn
Ramón Ramírez
Roberto Ramírez
A. J. Ramos
Fred Rath Jr.
Mark Redman
Jeff Reed
Steve Reed
Steven Register
Bryan Rekar
Desi Relaford
Michael Restovich
Dennys Reyes
José Reyes
René Reyes
Greg Reynolds
Mark Reynolds
Matt Reynolds
Armando Reynoso
Chris Richard
Juan Rincón
Kevin Ritz
Joe Roa
Ken Roberts
Brendan Rodgers
Josh Roenicke
Esmil Rogers
Jason Romano
J. C. Romero
Mandy Romero
Jorge Rondón
Wilin Rosario
Zac Rosscup
Brian Rose
Bruce Ruffin
Rio Ruiz
Glendon Rusch
Chris Rusin
Josh Rutledge

S

Bret Saberhagen
A. J. Sager
Mike Saipe
Jeff Salazar
Jesús Sánchez
Jonathan Sánchez
Mo Sanford
Antonio Santos
Víctor Santos
Rob Scahill
Tim Scott
Marco Scutaro
Bobby Seay
Kevin Sefcik
Antonio Senzatela
Dan Serafini
Scott Servais
Brian Serven
Scott Service
Chris Sexton
Bryan Shaw
Danny Sheaffer
Ryan Shealy
Jordan Sheffield
Keith Shepherd
Terry Shumpert
Allan Simpson
Bryn Smith
Chad Smith
Greg Smith
Jason Smith
Seth Smith
Juan Sosa
Justin Speier
Ryan Speier
Ryan Spilborghs
Dennis Stark
Robert Stephenson
Ian Stewart
Jim Stoops
Trevor Story
Huston Street
Mark Strittmatter
Drew Stubbs
Eric Stults
Chris Stynes
Cory Sullivan
Mac Suzuki
Mark Sweeney
Bill Swift

T

Raimel Tapia
Jim Tatum
Mike Tauchman
Julián Tavárez
Willy Taveras
Mark Thompson
Milt Thompson
John Thomson
Jesús Tinoco
Michael Toglia
Yorvit Torrealba
Carlos Torres
Ezequiel Tovar
Andy Tracy
Alan Trejo
Chin-hui Tsao
Troy Tulowitzki

U
José Ureña
Juan Uribe

V

Pat Valaika
Ty Van Burkleo
Cory Vance
John Vander Wal
Jerry Vasto
Greg Vaughn
Mike Venafro
Dave Veres
Ryan Vilade
Ron Villone
Luis Vizcaíno
Chris Volstad

W

Dave Wainhouse
Larry Walker
Pete Walker
Todd Walker
Bruce Walton
John Wasdin
Pat Watkins
Gary Wayne
Eric Wedge
Walt Weiss
Colton Welker
Kip Wells
Turk Wendell
Ryan Wheeler
Alex White
Derrick White
Gabe White
Rick White
Ty Wigginton
Jackson Williams
Randy Williams
Preston Wilson
Jay Witasick
Tony Wolters
Tony Womack
Jamey Wright

Y

Rafael Ynoa
Masato Yoshii
Eric Young
Eric Young Jr.
Gerald Young
Jason Young

Z

Gregg Zaun
Todd Zeile

External links
BR batting statistics
BR pitching statistics
Major League Baseball

Roster
Major League Baseball all-time rosters